The Dark Side of the Sun is a television serial written by Michael J. Bird and produced by the BBC in 1983.

Plot
The Dark Side of the Sun takes place on the Greek island of Rhodes. The story combines elements of supernatural Gothic romance with the contemporary conspiracy thriller. There are themes of telepathy and hypnosis, and a secret society, descended from the Knights Templar, holding clandestine meetings on the island.

The historical back-story is linked to the suppression of the Templars, and seems also loosely inspired by the overthrow of Foulques de Villaret, 25th Grand Master of the Knights Hospitaller. His former stronghold at Lindos was one of the main filming locations. The Templar conspiracy theory element in the modern plot-line shows some influences from The Holy Blood and the Holy Grail, which had been published the previous year.

Critical reaction
Writing in The Guardian, television critic Nancy Banks-Smith said "I don't understand any of it". Writing in The Times, critic Dennis Hackett stated he enjoyed the scenery and special effects but was less impressed by the rest.

Main cast
Peter Egan as Raoul Lavallière
Patrick Mower as Don Tierney
Emily Richard as Anne Tierney
Betty Arvaniti as Ismini Christoyannis
Christopher Scoular as David Bascombe
Godfrey James as Harry Brennan
Michael Sheard as Colonel von Reitz
Mark Barratt as Max
Brian Attree as Simon

Crew

Series written by: Michael J. Bird
Directed by: David Askey
Produced by: Vere Lorrimer
Designed by: Alex Gourlay
Theme music composed by: Stavros Xarhakos

Episodes

Production
The serial was the last in an unofficial quartet of serials written by Bird and set in the Mediterranean. The previous three were The Lotus Eaters, Who Pays the Ferryman? and The Aphrodite Inheritance.

The program's music was composed by the Greek composer Stavros Xarchakos.

References

1983 British television series debuts
1983 British television series endings
BBC television dramas
1980s British drama television series
English-language television shows
British fantasy television series